HMCS Edmundston was a  that served with the Royal Canadian Navy during the Second World War. She served primarily in the Battle of the Atlantic as a convoy escort. She was named for Edmundston, New Brunswick.

Background

Flower-class corvettes like Edmundston serving with the Royal Canadian Navy during the Second World War were different from earlier and more traditional sail-driven corvettes. The "corvette" designation was created by the French for classes of small warships; the Royal Navy borrowed the term for a period but discontinued its use in 1877. During the hurried preparations for war in the late 1930s, Winston Churchill reactivated the corvette class, needing a name for smaller ships used in an escort capacity, in this case based on a whaling ship design. The generic name "flower" was used to designate the class of these ships, which – in the Royal Navy – were named after flowering plants.

Corvettes commissioned by the Royal Canadian Navy during the Second World War were named after communities for the most part, to better represent the people who took part in building them. This idea was put forth by Admiral Percy W. Nelles. Sponsors were commonly associated with the community for which the ship was named. Royal Navy corvettes were designed as open sea escorts, while Canadian corvettes were developed for coastal auxiliary roles which was exemplified by their minesweeping gear. Eventually the Canadian corvettes would be modified to allow them to perform better on the open seas.

Construction
Edmundston was ordered on 14 February 1940 as part of the 1939–1940 Flower-class building program. She was laid down 23 August 1940 by Yarrows Ltd. at Esquimalt, British Columbia and launched 22 February 1941. Edmundston was commissioned at Esquimalt on 21 October 1941.

During her career, Edmundston underwent two significant refits. The first took place beginning in January 1943 at Halifax, Nova Scotia where her fo'c'sle was extended. The refit was finished in May 1943. The second major refit was done at Liverpool, Nova Scotia from May to July 1944.

War service
After workups, Edmundston was assigned to Esquimalt Force.

On 13 September 1942, Edmundston was reassigned to the Atlantic. She arrived at Halifax in October. Upon arrival she was assigned to the Western Local Escort Force. After workups following her first major refit, she joined the Royal Navy-controlled escort group EG 5, which protected convoys in the Atlantic and on routes to and from Gibraltar and Sierra Leone. She spent the next ten months as an ocean escort.

While this was in progress the ships were attacked at 14:15 by 14 Dornier Do 217s and 7 Junkers Ju 88s with the new German glide bomb weapon, the Henschel Hs293 A-1. Several sailors were injured in Bideford and one sailor was killed. Two days later the force sent to relieve Edmundstons group was also attacked and suffered losses.

After her second refit and workups in Bermuda, she joined Mid-Ocean Escort Force escort group C-8 in August 1944. She served with this group until the end of the war.

Post-war service
Edmundston was paid off at Sorel, Quebec on 16 June 1945. Under the new name Amepala she was last on Lloyd's Register in 1961–62. The ship was broken up in 1961.

References

External links

Flower-class corvettes of the Royal Canadian Navy
1941 ships